Willow Allen is a Canadian fashion model and content creator, from Inuvik, Northwest Territories.

Allen was scouted to become a model on social media in 2019 and subsequently signed with Mode Models. She has worked with the likes of Canada Goose, Louboutin and Elle Canada. Being on the cover of Elle Canada was "was a major career milestone" that got her started on her modeling career. She has worked in Singapore and New York. While in Singapore, she did modelling work for such brands as New Balance, Highsnobiety, Sony, Levi's and Prada.

Allen has also appeared in Canadian singer Tyler Shaw's music video for "When You're Home", which was filmed in Toronto.

Allen has a following on TikTok of over 500 thousand; she uses the platform to educate viewers about life in the Canadian Arctic and about her Inuit heritage.

Early and personal life
Allen was born and raised in Inuvik. She was studying social work at Grant MacEwan University when she was discovered. As of 2022, she was hoping to complete her degree and go on to work with native communities after she graduates.

Allen eloped prior to October 2022, and will have a traditional ceremony with Cale Kindrachuk in April 2023.

References

Canadian female models
Inuit women
People from Inuvik
Living people
1999 births